Irina Spîrlea was the defending champion and won in the final 7–6, 6–2 against Sabine Hack.

Seeds
A champion seed is indicated in bold text while text in italics indicates the round in which that seed was eliminated.

  Karina Habšudová (quarterfinals)
  Irina Spîrlea (champion)
  Sandra Cecchini (first round)
  Barbara Rittner (first round)
  Sabine Hack (final)
  Silvia Farina (quarterfinals)
  Natalia Medvedeva (semifinals)
  Virginia Ruano-Pascual (first round)

Draw

External links
 1995 Internazionali Femminili di Palermo Draw

Internazionali Femminili di Palermo
1995 WTA Tour